Yeshayahu Press (March 2, 1874 – June 11, 1955) was a prominent researcher of the land of Israel. He was born in Jerusalem, which his father, Haim Press, helped build. 
Givat Yeshayahu was named after him.  He wrote Topographical-Historical Encyclopedia of the Land of Israel. During the Ottoman rule over Palestine, Press served as the first Secretary of the Teachers' Union, during which time he also helped to establish the Jewish Palestine Exploration Society. With the founding the political state of Modern Israel, Press was among the driving force behind the establishment of the "Government Naming Committee" in 1949.

References

Israeli geographers
Jews in Ottoman Palestine
1874 births
1955 deaths
People from Jerusalem